Lee Yue-hwan (born 12 August 1958) is a Taiwanese former breaststroke swimmer. She competed in two events at the 1972 Summer Olympics.

References

External links
 

1958 births
Living people
Taiwanese female breaststroke swimmers
Olympic swimmers of Taiwan
Swimmers at the 1972 Summer Olympics
Place of birth missing (living people)